San Pablo de los Montes is a municipality located in the province of Toledo, Castile-La Mancha, Spain. According to the 2006 census (INE), the municipality has a population of 2282 inhabitants.

San Pablo de los Montes is located below the Sierra de San Pablo, part of the Montes de Toledo range.

References

Municipalities in the Province of Toledo